The 1979 Pan American Games, officially known as the VIII Pan American Games, were a continental multi-sport event held in San Juan, Puerto Rico, from July 1 to July 15, 1979. At the Games, 3,700 athletes selected from 34 National Olympic Committees (NOCs) participated in events in 22 sports. Twenty-one nations earned medals during the competition, and nine won at least one gold medal.

Medal table 

The ranking in this table is based on medal counts published by several media organizations. By default, the table is ordered by the number of gold medals won by the athletes representing a nation. (In this context, a nation is an entity represented by a NOC). The number of silver medals is taken into consideration next and then the number of bronze medals. If nations are still tied, equal ranking is given and they are listed alphabetically by IOC country code.

To sort this table by nation, total medal count, or any other column, click on the  icon next to the column title.

Notes 

  Some sources appoint that Canada achieved 70 bronze medals, despite the majority of reports counting 71. This would result in a total of 137 medals earned by Canadian athletes during the Games.

References 

General

 

Specific

See also 

Medal table
Pan American Games medal tables